The vault is an artistic gymnastics event held at the Summer Olympics. The event was first held for men at the first modern Olympics in 1896. It was held again in 1904, but not in 1900, 1908, 1912, or 1920 when no apparatus events were awarded medals. The vault was one of the components of the men's artistic individual all-around in 1900, however. The men's vault returned as a medal event in 1924 and has been held every Games since. Vault scores were included in the individual all-around for 1924 and 1928, with no separate apparatus final. In 1932, the vault was entirely separate from the all-around. From 1936 to 1956, there were again no separate apparatus finals with the vault scores used in the all-around. The women's vault was added in 1952 and has been held every Games since. Beginning in 1960, there were separate apparatus finals.

The vault used a "vaulting horse" until 2000; after that, a "vaulting table" has been used.

Medalists

Men

Multiple medalists

Medalists by country

Women

Multiple medalists

Medalists by country

Gallery

Sidehorse vault

The 1924 Summer Olympics had an odd programme. The regular vault event featured an unusual format, using a bar that had to be jumped over between the springboard and the vaulting horse. There was also a "sidehorse vault" event in which the competitors used a vaulting horse set sideways (perpendicular to the approach) to turn make a single flip. This was the only time that event was held.

References

Vault
Vault at the Olympics